Tryne Sound is a short, narrow passage on the north side of Langnes Peninsula, Vestfold Hills, connecting Tryne Bay and Tryne Fjord. Mapped by Norwegian cartographers from air photos taken by the Lars Christensen Expedition (1936–37) and named Tryne Sund (snout sound).

Sounds of Antarctica
Bodies of water of Princess Elizabeth Land
Ingrid Christensen Coast